VR Troopers is a 1995 fighting game based on the American syndicated television series of the same name that itself used elements from several different Japanese tokusatsu shows from the Metal Hero Series. The fighting game was developed by Syrox Developments and published by Sega. The game was released on the Sega Genesis and the Sega Game Gear.

Plot 
Antagonist Grimlord sends an arcade game to Tao's Dojo which ends up sucking protagonists Ryan Steele, J.B. Reese, and Kaitlin Star into Virtual Reality. To escape, they embark on a mission to defeat Grimlord's Skugs and monsters.

Gameplay

Genesis Version 
The player has three modes to choose from. Story Game, Vs. Battle, and CPU duel. Story Game is a mode where the player can choose from any one of the three VR Troopers to face off against the evil leader Grimlord's mutants and cyborgs and eventually Grimlord. Vs. Battle is a two-player mode where a player and a friend can face off against each other. CPU duel is a simple fight between the player and an opponent controlled by the computer. The player can choose their fighter, and what stage they want to fight on. If the player chooses a fighter and the opponent is the same fighter, the opponents character gets re-skinned a different color.

Game Gear Version 
The player has two modes to choose from. Story Game and Battle Game. Story Game is a mode where the player can choose from any one of the three VR Troopers to face off against the evil leader Grimlord's mutants and cyborgs. Battle Game is a ladder-type fighting game mode where the player can choose from eight different characters to beat a certain number of enemies and win the game. The player must face a ninth character original to the game called Kamelion who can shape-shift to any other character.

Reception
Next Generation reviewed the Genesis version of the game, rating it one star out of five, and stated that "this game is exceptionally generic with some real simplistic fighting (good for kids, though) and nothing that makes it worth owning unless you're a huge fan of the show."

Reviews
GamePro (Jan, 1996)
Electronic Gaming Monthly (Dec, 1995)
Mean Machines - Feb, 1996
Superjuegos (Dec, 1995)
Mega Force (Mar, 1996)
Mega Fun (Dec, 1995)
Sega News (Nov, 1996)
Sega Magazin (Germany) (Dec, 1995)
Video Games (Dec, 1995)
Gamers (Germany) (Dec, 1995)

References

External links 
 VR Troopers at GameFAQs
 VR Troopers at Giant Bomb
 VR Troopers at MobyGames

1995 video games
Game Gear games
Sega Genesis games
Tokusatsu video games
Video games based on television series
Video games developed in the United States
VR Troopers